Think Big Big (Chinese: 大大哒) is a 2018 Malaysian Mandarin-language film directed by Chiu Keng Guan.

References

External links 

Malaysian comedy-drama films
2010s Mandarin-language films
Films directed by Chiu Keng Guan